BOK Park Plaza is an office skyscraper in Oklahoma City, Oklahoma. Construction began in 2015 and the building was completed in 2018. At a height of 433 ft (132 m), it is the sixth tallest building in Oklahoma City. The building contains 27 floors and received an LEED-CS GOLD energy label. 

Bank of Oklahoma has their Oklahoma City headquarters offices here.

Construction
In 2015, One North Hudson, the Motor Hotel, the Union Bus Station, and several other small buildings were demolished to make way for the BOK Park Plaza. In November 2015, the crane was installed. On May 27, 2017, the building topped-out.

Tenants 
Bank of Oklahoma Oklahoma City Headquarters
Devon Energy Corporation
Enable Midstream Partners World Headquarters

See also
List of tallest buildings in Oklahoma City
List of tallest buildings in Oklahoma

References

Buildings and structures in Oklahoma City
Skyscraper office buildings in Oklahoma City
Office buildings completed in 2018
2018 establishments in Oklahoma